"Haiti I am Sorry", or simply "Haiti", is a calypso song written and composed by David Rudder, and first recorded in 1988 for the album Haiti by David Rudder and Charlie's Roots. The song, which begins with the words: "Toussaint was a mighty man/ and to make matters worse he was black...", is a tribute to the glory and suffering of Haiti, and was described in the AllMusic review as "a remarkable ode to Caribbean unity".

Personnel

Impact 
The song has been credited with having in 1988 "brought impoverished Creole-speaking Haiti to the attention of the English-speaking Caribbean", and is frequently referenced in connection with ongoing political and environmental problems in Haiti. It was selected by Margaret Busby as one her eight musical choices on Desert Island Discs in June 2021.

See also
 June 1988 Haitian coup d'état
 September 1988 Haitian coup d'état

References

External links

1988 songs
Calypso songs
Reggae songs
Soca songs
Songs about Haiti